Morris Clinton House is a historic home located at Newark Valley in Tioga County, New York. It was built in 1881 and is an L-shaped, -story, frame house, with a 2-story wood shed wing at the north end of the rear ell.  In 1882, the house was featured in an agricultural journal as an example of progressive rural architecture.  Also on the property are a milk house, two small livestock sheds, and a garage or small carriage house.

It was listed on the National Register of Historic Places in 1998.

References

Houses on the National Register of Historic Places in New York (state)
Houses completed in 1881
Houses in Tioga County, New York
National Register of Historic Places in Tioga County, New York
1881 establishments in New York (state)